Västerbotten County is a county or län in the north of Sweden. It shares the borders with the counties of Västernorrland, Jämtland, and Norrbotten, as well as the Norwegian county of Nordland and the Gulf of Bothnia. Its capital is Umeå that houses about half of the population when combined with the largest town in the northern part Skellefteå. The two municipalities themselves are making up the majority of the population. The county has vast wilderness areas and Västerbotten County has a land area larger than Denmark, the Netherlands and Switzerland.

Provinces 

For history, geography, and culture, see: Västerbotten, Lapland, and Ångermanland

Västerbotten County covers the province of Västerbotten and parts of the provinces Lapland and Ångermanland. Prior to 1809, though, it covered much more extensive space.

Administration 
The main aim of the County Administrative Board is to fulfil the goals set in national politics by the Riksdag and the Government, to co-ordinate the interests of the county, to promote the development of the county, to establish regional goals, and to safeguard the due process of law in the handling of each case. The County Administrative Board is a Government Agency headed by a Governor. See List of Västerbotten Governors.

Politics 
The County Council of Västerbotten or Västerbotten läns landsting.

Riksdag elections 
The table details all Riksdag election results of Västerbotten County since the unicameral era began in 1970. The blocs denote which party would support the Prime Minister or the lead opposition party towards the end of the elected parliament.

Governors 
See: List of governors of Västerbotten County

Municipalities 

In Lapland Province:
Dorotea
Lycksele
Malå
Sorsele
Storuman
Vilhelmina
Åsele

In Västerbotten Province:
Norsjö
Robertsfors
Skellefteå
Umeå
Vindeln
Vännäs

In Ångermanland Province:
Bjurholm
Nordmaling

Demographics

Foreign background 
SCB have collected statistics on backgrounds of residents since 2002. These tables consist of all who have two foreign-born parents or are born abroad themselves. The chart lists election years and the last year on record alone.

Heraldry 
The arms for Västerbotten County is a combination of the arms of Västerbotten, Swedish Lapland, and Ångermanland. When it is shown with a royal crown, it represents the County Administrative Board. Blazon: "Parted per fess, base parted per pale, the arms of Västerbotten, the arms of Lapland, and the arms of Ångermanland."

See also 
 Duke of Västerbotten, a title for members of the royal family (see Duchies in Sweden)
 North Sweden European Office

References and notes

External links 

Regional Association of Local Authorities in Västerbotten
Västerbotten County Administrative Board
Västerbotten County Council

 

 
Counties of Sweden
County
Lapland (Sweden)
States and territories established in 1638
1638 establishments in Sweden